Jaime Cervantes Rivera (born 7 March 1955) is a Mexican politician from the Labor Party. From 2006 to 2009 he served as Deputy of the LX Legislature of the Mexican Congress representing Nayarit. He previously served in the Congress of Nayarit.

References

1955 births
Living people
Politicians from Nayarit
Labor Party (Mexico) politicians
21st-century Mexican politicians
Autonomous University of Nayarit alumni
Members of the Congress of Nayarit
20th-century Mexican politicians
People from Tuxpan, Nayarit
Deputies of the LX Legislature of Mexico
Members of the Chamber of Deputies (Mexico) for Nayarit